Trout Unlimited (TU) is a US non-profit organization dedicated to the conservation of freshwater streams, rivers, and associated upland habitats for trout, salmon, other aquatic species, and people. It is headquartered in Arlington, Virginia.  The organization began in 1959 in Michigan. It has since spread throughout the United States and has local chapters in nearly every State in the United States.

Trout Unlimited History and Profile
Trout Unlimited was established in 1959 along the banks of Michigan's Au Sable River by a group of 16 anglers who were interested in protecting trout in that and other popular fishing rivers. Founders included Art Neumann and George Griffith, creator of the popular fly pattern Griffith's Gnat. The first president was Dr. Casey E. Westell Jr. Neumann was the first vice president.

TU is a national organization with more than 150,000 formal members organized into about 400 chapters in nearly every state. The organization's annual budget is approximately $50 million. Trout Unlimited has achieved a rating score of 88.26 from Charity Navigator.

Trout Unlimited's staff currently numbers about 220. About 25 of the staff members are based in the organization's national office is in Arlington, Virginia. The others work throughout the country in regional offices.

The staff is organized into several departments, including Volunteer Operations, Science, Eastern Conservation, Western Conservation, Government Affairs and media and marketing.

The organization has developed various tools to help prioritize protection, restoration and conservation efforts. Tools include the Conservation Success Index (CSI), a framework for assessing the health of coldwater fish species throughout their native range, the Brook Trout Portfolio Analysis, which utilizes GIS technology to assess brook trout habitat strongholds.

Organization

Membership types include Stream Explorer youth member, regular member, life member, and corporate member. All members receive the TU magazine, Trout.  Benefits of chapter membership includes receiving the chapter newsletter or e-newsletter, invitations to chapter meetings, events or projects. Chapters range in geographic size from a single watershed to an entire state and in membership size from less than 20 to more than 4,000. Because TU is a publicly supported 501(c)(3) organized under a group exemption, each chapter (and council) is required to have its own employer identification number (EIN) and file its own tax forms with the IRS. TU chapters are financially independent of the national organization.

TU chapters in a region are organized into a council. Most are organized by state boundaries; however some councils are made up of more than one state (for example the Mid-Atlantic Council which serves Maryland, Delaware and Washington, D.C.). In most cases, the council serves as an umbrella organization for its chapters, state-wide. Councils are the key link between the TU staff and local chapters.  The following Councils existed in 2021:

Alaska
Arizona
Arkansas
California
Colorado
Connecticut
Idaho
Illinois
Indiana
Indian Nations Council (Oklahoma)
Iowa
Kansas
Kentucky
Maine
Mid-Atlantic
Massachusetts/Rhode Island
Michigan
Minnesota
Montana
Nebraska
Nevada
New Hampshire
New Jersey
New Mexico
New York
North Carolina
North Dakota
Ohio
Ozark
Oregon
Pennsylvania
South Carolina
South Dakota
Tennessee
Texas
Utah
Vermont
Virginia
Washington
West Virginia
Wisconsin
Wyoming

The National Leadership Council (NLC) is TU's volunteer body that helps to set the direction of TU and is made up of one representative elected from each council.

TU's Board of Trustees (BOT) guides the organization. The BOT, consisting of 32 individuals, meets in person three times a year to review and approve financial and organizational decisions. 

The TU Strategic Plan identifies four key areas of focus for the organization's staff and volunteers, including:
Protect high quality habitat for native and wild coldwater fish.
Reconnect fragmented fish populations and habitats by improving instream flows and removing fish passage barriers.
Restore watersheds by working in collaboration with others.
Sustain TU conservation efforts by inspiring and training present and future generations of conservation stewards.

Activities
Trout Unlimited undertakes projects, programs and awareness campaigns at both the volunteer/chapter level, and at the staff level.

Local chapter activities typically include stream restoration work, participating in citizen science, advocacy, educational programs, group fishing outings, and outreach activities for youth, women and veterans.

Stream restoration focuses on improving habitat for trout and other coldwater species, including aquatic insects. Tactics can include planting trees and shrubs along streams to reduce erosion while also increasing shade, strategic addition of boulders or trees to provide cover and improve water depth and flow, and removing or improving barriers that block fish passage, such as culverts and dams.

TU members tallied more than 734,000 volunteer hours in 2017.

Trout Unlimited's staff of restoration specialists and project managers undertake similar restoration activities, often on a larger scale and often in collaboration with partners. The work is informed by research from staff scientists.

Trout Unlimited advocates on issues of interest at both a local volunteer and staff level. In recent years, for example, Trout Unlimited has publicly opposed a large-scale proposed mine (Pebble Mine) in Alaska's Bristol Bay. Trout Unlimited has also been active in opposing legislative efforts to transfer public lands from federal ownership.

Trout Unlimited established a program in the early 2000s to train volunteers to monitor streams in areas of natural gas extraction in the East's Marcellus Shale region.  The program has expanded to include monitoring in areas where pipelines are proposed or being constructed. Several hundred volunteers have been trained in the program and they have helped to identify a number of pollution events that were subsequently addressed.

Trout in the Classroom is one of TU's largest youth education initiatives. Volunteers help teachers set up aquariums in the classrooms, and students raise trout from eggs during the school year. The program supports ecology-related curriculum and helps to educate students in the importance of cold, clean water not only for trout, but also for people. 

TU's Veteran's Service Program provides activities and engagement for former and current military members and their families. The organization also has an active diversity initiative to expand the reach of conservation and fly fishing. TU's 5 Rivers program is aimed at college students.

Funding
Trout Unlimited draws some of its funding from membership fees and contributions.  Chapters often undertake fundraising activities to pay for their restoration work, or they may seek grants through TU's Embrace a Stream program.

Projects undertaken by scientists and conservationists working for Trout Unlimited are funded through competitive grants as well as cost-share agreements with federal agencies such as the U.S. Forest Service, the U.S. Department of Agriculture, the National Park Service and the Bureau of Land Management. These grants fund large projects such as dam removal and culvert removals or repairs, bank stabilization and restoration, in-stream habitat building.

References

External links
Trout Unlimited Twitter

Nature conservation organizations based in the United States
Recreational fishing in the United States
1959 establishments in the United States
Organizations established in 1959
Fly fishing